Kai-Erik Klaus Kalima (6 October 1945 – 13 January 2023) was a Finnish law professor and politician. A member of the Social Democratic Party, he served in the Parliament of Finland from 1989 to 1991.

Kalima served as a professor of municipal law at Tampere University and financial law at Helsinki University.

Kalima died on 13 January 2023, at the age of 77.

References

1945 births
2023 deaths
Members of the Parliament of Finland (1987–91)
Social Democratic Party of Finland MEPs
Academic staff of the University of Helsinki
Academic staff of the University of Tampere
Finnish lawyers
Lawyers from Helsinki